The Journal of Lightwave Technology is a biweekly peer-reviewed scientific journal covering optical guided-wave science, technology, and engineering. It is published jointly by the Optical Society and the IEEE Photonics Society. It was established in 1983 and the editor-in-chief is Gabriella Bosco (Politecnico di Torino). According to the Journal Citation Reports, the journal has a 2021 impact factor of 4.439.

References

External links 
 

Engineering journals
English-language journals
IEEE academic journals
Biweekly journals
Publications established in 1983
Optics journals
Optica (society) academic journals